John "Jack" Johnston (13 March 1923 – 14 October 2003) was a British econometrician. He spent most of his career at the University of Manchester, and later University of California, Irvine. Johnston is particularly known for authoring Econometric Methods (First edition 1964), one of the earliest and most popular textbooks in econometrics, the most recent editions being co-authored with John DiNardo.

Johnston died in 2003 at UC Irvine Medical Center from complications of Parkinson's disease.

References 

1923 births
2003 deaths
Scientists from Belfast
British statisticians
Alumni of Queen's University Belfast
Alumni of the University of Wales
Academics of the Victoria University of Manchester
University of California, Irvine faculty
Fellows of the Econometric Society
British expatriates in the United States